Sven Adriaan Botman (born 12 January 2000) is a Dutch professional footballer who plays as a centre-back for  club Newcastle United. He has represented the Netherlands at youth levels under-15 through under-21.

Club career

Ajax
On 23 June 2018, Botman made his debut for the senior team of Ajax in a friendly against VVSB. He made his Eerste Divisie debut for Jong Ajax on 17 August 2018 in a game against Roda JC Kerkrade.

Lille
On 31 July 2020, Botman signed a five-year contract with Ligue 1 club Lille. The deal was worth approximately €8 to €9 million.

Newcastle United
On 28 June 2022, Botman signed for Premier League club Newcastle United on a five-year deal for €37 million.

International career
He has captained the Netherlands at under-21 level, as well as being called up to the senior Netherlands squad for the first time in November 2020. In October 2022, Botman was included in the preliminary squad for the 2022 FIFA World Cup.

Career statistics

Honours
Lille
Ligue 1: 2020–21
Trophée des Champions: 2021

Newcastle United
EFL Cup runner-up: 2022–23

References

External links

Profile at the Newcastle United F.C. website

2000 births
Living people
People from Haarlemmermeer
Footballers from North Holland
Dutch footballers
Association football defenders
AFC Ajax players
Jong Ajax players
SC Heerenveen players
Lille OSC players
Newcastle United F.C. players
Eerste Divisie players
Eredivisie players
Ligue 1 players
Premier League players
Netherlands youth international footballers
Netherlands under-21 international footballers
Dutch expatriate footballers
Expatriate footballers in England
Expatriate footballers in France
Dutch expatriate sportspeople in England
Dutch expatriate sportspeople in France
21st-century Dutch people